In general relativity, a gravitational plane wave is a special class of a vacuum pp-wave spacetime, and may be defined in terms of Brinkmann coordinates by

Here,  can be any smooth functions; they control the waveform of the two possible polarization modes of gravitational radiation.  In this context, these two modes are usually called the plus mode and cross mode, respectively.

See also

vacuum solution (general relativity)

Exact solutions in general relativity